The 1974 European Cup final was contested between Bayern München of West Germany and Atlético Madrid of Spain. This marked the first time in club history for both Bayern and Atlético to contest in a European Cup final. Goals in extra time from Luis Aragonés and Hans-Georg Schwarzenbeck cancelled each other out, so a replay took place two days later. Bayern won the replay convincingly, with two goals each from Uli Hoeneß and Gerd Müller, giving the German side a 4–0 victory. This is the only European Cup/Champions League final to have been replayed.

Route to the final

Match

Details

Replay

Details

See also
1973–74 European Cup
Atletico Madrid in European football
FC Bayern Munich in international football competitions

References

External links
1973-74 season at UEFA website

1
FC Bayern Munich matches
Atlético Madrid matches
1974
Sports competitions in Brussels
1974
1973–74 in Belgian football
1973–74 in Spanish football
1973–74 in German football
1970s in Brussels
May 1974 sports events in Europe